Paolo Carbone (born 13 July 1982) is an Italian professional footballer who is a free agent after his contract with Savona.

Club career

Early career 
Carbone along with Riccardo Musetti, were exchanged with Johan Michel Romeo and Roberto D'Auria of Napoli in 2001 in a co-ownership deal. In June 2002 Napoli acquired the full registration rights.

Bellinzona 
After he spent his career in the Italian lower divisions, he left for the Swiss Challenge League side Bellinzona in July 2005, which the club was from the Italian speaking region of Switzerland.

After the club promoted him to Swiss Super League in 2008, he was loaned to 1.Liga club Chiasso in March 2009.

Savona 
In August 2010, he returned to Italy for Savona.

Honours 
 Swiss Cup: 2008

References

External links 
 Profile at savonaclub.it 
 
 Profile at Swiss Football League

Italian footballers
Italian expatriate footballers
Swiss Super League players
U.C. Sampdoria players
AC Bellinzona players
FC Chiasso players
Savona F.B.C. players
Association football central defenders
Italian expatriate sportspeople in Switzerland
Expatriate footballers in Switzerland
Footballers from Genoa
1982 births
Living people
Asti Calcio F.C. players
Acqui U.S. 1911 players